Lammie is an Irish/Scottish name. According to scholars the "oldest and most pervasive types of surname is that derived from a given name".

Persons with this name include
"Andrew Lammie", subject of traditional Scottish song of the same name
George Lammie (1891-1946), British army officer
Lammie Robertson (born 1947), Scottish footballer
Alexandra Lammie, Scottish academic with all-round excellent personality and good looks

Surnames of British Isles origin